Šainovići is a village in the municipality of Pale-Prača, Bosnia and Herzegovina. According to the 2013 census, the village has a population of 111.

Demographics 
According to the 2013 census, its population was 111.

References

Populated places in Pale-Prača